Fassett is a municipality and village in the Papineau Regional County Municipality in Quebec, Canada, located on the north shore of the Ottawa River east of Montebello.

Its main access roads are Route 148, which passes through the town, and Autoroute 50 which passes to the north.

History
The area was part of the Petite-Nation Seigneury, formed in 1674  and originally owned by François de Laval, the first bishop of New France. The seigneury was acquired in 1803 by Joseph Papineau, who became its first civilian lord, and later sold it to his son Louis-Joseph Papineau.

The area became of interest economically when England was forced to rely on its colonies for wood for construction of its vessels during the Napoleonic blockade of 1807. It was full of oaks, pines, and maples regarding which Surveyor Joseph Bouchette wrote in 1815: "the terrain rises and is covered with wood of the best species: oaks are of high quality and particularly of large size, suitable for the construction of vessels."

In 1815 the original mission of Notre Dame de Bonsecours was created and in 1821 a chapel dedicated to Notre-Dame de Bonsecours (Our Lady of Good Help) was constructed. On September 30, 1831, the bishop of Quebec Bernard-Claude Panet granted a petition signed by Denis-Benjamin Papineau and over 75 tenants for the formation of a parish. His decree called the new parish Notre-Dame-de-Bonsecours-de-la-Petite-Nation and also recommended the people of Bonsecours to acquire civil recognition from the Governor General of Canada, Lord Aylmer.

On June 18, 1845, the Governor General of the Province of Canada, Charles Metcalfe, established local and municipal authorities in Lower Canada, under a new law passed by the provincial Parliament. One of the new municipalities created was the Municipality of Petite-Nation, which included the Parish of Notre-Dame-de-Bonsecours-de-la-Petite-Nation. However, this municipality was abolished in 1847.

On July 1, 1855, a new statute of the Province of Canada came into force, which allowed the parish to get official civilian recognition, known as Parish Municipality of Notre-Dame-de-Bon-Secours-de-la-Petite-Nation.

On August 22, 1878, Montebello separated from the parish municipality.

In the 1870s, the Quebec, Montreal, Ottawa and Occidental Railway was built, connecting Montreal to Ottawa.  The rail-line went through the municipality of Notre-Dame, in what is now Fassett.  The Canadian Pacific Railway bought the line in 1882.

In the late 1890s, there was a dispute between the municipality of Notre-Dame-de-Bonsecours and the Canadian Pacific Railway, which resulted in a court case that went all the way to the Judicial Committee of the Privy Council in Britain, the highest court of appeal for the British Empire.  A ditch beside the rail-line had become clogged, resulting in flooding on the neighbouring land, owned by Julien Gervais.  The municipality issued an order to the CPR, directing it to clean the obstruction.  The CPR refused, arguing that as a federally incorporated railway, it was not required to comply with provincial law.  The Quebec courts held that the provincial law did apply, and the CPR appealed to the Judicial Committee.  In 1899, the Judicial Committee ruled in favour of the municipality and upheld the order to clean the ditch, in the case known as Canadian Pacific Railway Co. v Notre Dame de Bonsecours.  The decision of the Judicial Committee continues to be cited with approval by the Supreme Court of Canada.

In the early 20th centre, the Canadian Pacific Railway built a small station here, and in 1906, the Thomas family,  a post office. Both were named Fassett in honour of Jacob Sloat Fassett, President from 1904 until his death in 1924,  of the Haskell Lumber Company renamed Fassett Lumber Company in 1910. Fassett was a lawyer and congressman from Elmira, New York who spent summers in a large beach estate he had built in Falmouth, Massachusetts on what is today known as Fassett's Point at the end of Little Island Road.

In 1913, the parish of Saint-Fidèle de Fassett was formed out of the Notre-Dame-de-Bonsecours Parish, and in 1918, the municipality split along these parish boundaries. The large rural and forested area became the Parish Municipality of Notre-Dame-de-Bon-Secours-Partie-Nord (which became the Municipality of Notre-Dame-de-Bonsecours in 2003). In 1951, the Parish Municipality of Notre-Dame-de-Bon-Secours became the Municipality of Fassett, named after the Fassett Lumber Company.

Demographics

Mother tongue:
 English as first language: 2.4%
 French as first language: 92.4%
 English and French as first language: 2.4%
 Other as first language: 3.5%

References

External links

Community Demographics
The Salmon River and Northern Railway
Family Tree of Jacob Sloat Fassett

Municipalities in Quebec
Incorporated places in Outaouais